Pleurofusia feddeni is an extinct species of sea snail, a marine gastropod mollusk in the family Drilliidae.

Distribution
This extinct marine species was found in Oligocene strata of Myanmar; age range:28.4 to 23.03 Ma.

References
Notes

Bibliography
 Noetling, Fritz. On some marine fossils from the Miocene of Upper Burma. Governor General of India, 1895.
 E. Vredenburg. 1921. Results of a revision of some portions of Dr Noetling's second monograph on the Tertiary fauna of Burma. Records of the Geological Survey of India 51:224–302

External links

feddeni
Gastropods described in 1895